Hisar district is one of the 22 districts of Haryana, India. Hisar city serves as the district headquarters. Hisar district has four sub-divisions that is, Hisar, Barwala, Hansi and Narnaud, each headed by an SDM. The district is also part of Hisar division. Hisar was founded by Firuz Shah Tughlaq.

The largest district in Haryana until its 1966 reorganization, some parts of Hisar were transferred to the newly created Jind district. In 1974, Tehsil Bhiwani and Loharu were transferred to Bhiwani district. Hisar was further bifurcated when Sirsa district was formed. Fatehabad district was later created as well.

Hisar is a divisional headquarters of the Hisar division and also the headquarters of Police Range. It is also a battalion headquarters of B.S.F. 3rd Bn. H.A.P. and commando force. In order to accommodate all of these departments, a five-storey District Administrative Complex was built, with the offices transferred in 1980. It adjoins the new Judiciary Complex, which is also made functional. This administrative and judiciary complex is the largest in Haryana; as a district headquarters it may be one of the largest in the country.

It is one of the five cities belonging to Sarasvati Valley Civilization while its name is cited in the history books in the context of Indus civilization and in general knowledge books as the location of Banawali, one of five sheep farms.  it is the second most populous of the 21 districts of Haryana, after Faridabad.

Hisar is also known as the steel city because of the Jindal Stainless Steel Factories. It is also the largest producer of galvanized iron in India.

Geography

North Hisar district falls in doab between Ghagghar river flowing through fatehabad district and paleo channel of Dhrishadvati river flowing through the Narnaul tehsil. Eastern, central and south-eastern Hisar district falls in doab between Dhrishadvati river and Yamuna river. Western Hisar district is part of bagar tract. The regions of the doabs  near the rivers consist of low-lying, flood-prone, but usually very fertile khadir and the higher-lying land away from the rivers consist of bangar, less prone to flooding but also less fertile on average. For the purpose of irrigation, Hisar district has been classified into 5 circles, namely barani (low rain area where rain-fed dry farming is practiced which nowadays are dependent on tubewells for the irrigation), bagar (dry sandy tract of land on the border of Rajasthan state adjoining the states of Haryana and Pujab) nahri (canal-irrigated land), nali or naili (fertile prairie tract between the Ghaggar river and the southern limits of the Saraswati channel depression in northern Hissar district of Haryana that gets flooded during the rains), and Rangoi tract (an area irrigated by the Rangoi canal made for the purpose of carrying flood waters of Ghagghar river to dry areas).

Hisar has fertile alluvial soil interspersed with highly permeable very sandy tracts in bagar tract several with water table more than 100 feet below ground containing brackish water usually unfit for human consumption, where dust storms frequent during the warm summer months from April till the end of July when monsoon arrives. Previously, Hisar was solely based on the rain and irrigation was possible only in the nali region where the season Ghaggar river flows in North Hisar. After the opening of Bhakra Nangal Dam canal system in 1963 as well as the earlier Western Yamuna Canal now irrigate most of Haryana including all of the Bagar region falling in Haryana on its western border. Opening of Indira Gandhi Canal in 1983 (specially Hansi Butana branches) brought the water of Sutlej and Beas rivers to the fields of Rajasthan including its Bagar tract stabilizing the sand dunes and soil erosion by preventing the expansion of desert.

Climate

Hisar has a warm climate.

History

The district suffered famine in 1783-84 (Chalisa famine), 1838, 1860-61, 1896-97 and 1899-1900.

Administrative divisions
Hisar continued to be the District Headquarters of the largest District in the state until its reorganization in 1966 when parts were carved out to create the new Jind District. The Tehsil Bhiwani and Loharu estate were later transferred to Bhiwani district on its creation in 1974. It was further bifurcated when Sirsa district was created entirely out of Hisar District. Fatehabad district has now been carved out of this district.

At present Hisar district consists of the eight tehsils of Adampur, Agroha, Barwala, Hisar, Hansi-1, Hansi-2, Narnaund and Uklanamandi,  two Sub-Tehsils of Balsamand and Bass. Vehicle registration numbers for Hisar district are: Hisar HR 20 and HR 39 (commercial no), Hansi HR 21 and Barwala HR 80.

Hisar is a divisional headquarters of the Divisional Commissioner and also the headquarters of the Police Range. It is also a battalion Headquarters of Border Security Force, 3rd battalion of Haryana Armed Police and police commando force. All these departments are now housed in a five storied District Administrative Complex completed in 1980, which adjoins the new Judiciary Complex.

The district has seven Vidhan Sabha constituencies, namely, Adampur, Uklana, Narnaund, Hansi, Barwala, Hisar and Nalwa. All of these are part of Hisar Lok Sabha constituency

Demographics

 the district had a population of 1,743,931, roughly equal to the nation of The Gambia or the US state of Nebraska. This gave it a ranking of 276th in India out of a total of 640 districts. Its population growth rate over the decade 2001-2011 was 13.38%. Hisar has a sex ratio of 871 females for every 1000 males, and a literacy rate of 73.2%. Scheduled Castes make up 23.44% of the population.

Hisar is 98% Hindu, only about 40,000 are Muslims, rest are mostly Jain and Sikhs. Nearly all Muslims of Hisar left for Pakistan during Partition.

At the time of the 2011 Census of India, 68.76% of the population in the district spoke Haryanvi, 26.40% Hindi and 2.41% Punjabi as their first language. Haryanvi is the most spoken dialect in the district.

The important social groups in the district are Jats, Bishnois, Brahmins, Sainis, Banias, Agrawal Jains, Ahirs, Gujjars, Kumhars, Aroras, Chamars and Balmikis. Jat is the largest social group in the city. They are of two types, Deswalis and Bagris. Bishnois have migrated from Rajasthan. There are three sections of Brahmins in the district, i.e., Gaur, Bias and Khandelwal. Most of the Aroras are migrant from West Punjab after the partition of the country in 1947. Banias are divided into Aggarwals, Oswals and Maheshwaris. The Aggarwals are said to be the descendants of the inhabitants of Agroha. They hold Agroha in great reverence. Oswals and Maheshwaris trace their origin to the Rajasthan. The Gujjars of Hisar trace their origin to Rajasthan.
Hisar is also the origin place of Agrawal Jain Community, with Hansi being an important Jain pilgrimage town.

Religion

Tehsils

Education

Universities
 Chaudhary Charan Singh Haryana Agricultural University, initially founded as a campus of the Punjab Agricultural University, Ludhiana.
 Lala Lajpat Rai University of Veterinary and Animal Sciences. A statue and memorial of Lala Lajpat Rai stands on the campus to commemorate this patriot.
 Guru Jambheshwar University of Science and Technology, founded in 1995, attracts students for higher education from all over the country and abroad.
 Om Sterling Global University, private university

Govt colleges 
There are 10 govt degree colleges in Hisar.
 Govt. Post Graduate College, Hisar
 Govt. College for Girls, Hisar

 Private colleges
 Dayanand college
 CRM JAT College
 Chhaju Ram Law College, Hisar
 Chhaju Ram College of Education, Hisar
 Fateh Chand College for Women (Lahore), Hisar
 Maharaja Agrasen Medical College, Agroha

Schools
Hisar also has several renowned schools including Leading Angel Public School, Hisar (LAPS), Indus Public School, Hisar (IPS), Army Public School, Hisar (APS), Thakur Dass Bhargava Senior Secondary Model School , Vidya Devi Jindal School  and O.P.JINDAL MODERN SCHOOL .

Notable individuals
Over the past three centuries Hisar had been the birthplace of individuals including Sardar Ishri Singh, Sardar Harji Ram and Rai Bahadur Sardar Nau Nihal Singh who were honorary magistrates in pre-Independence Hisar. Noteworthy individuals include the Lala Lajpat Rai (freedom fighter, elected member of Hisar municipal committee, founder of Hisar district congress (1986), Arya samaj (1986) and district bar council), Captain Abhimanyu Sindhu (entrepreneur, journalist, BJP national spokesperson and Minister in Haryana from Narnaund assembly constituency), late Dr. Gopi Chand Bhargava (First Chief Minister of joint Punjab), Om Prakash Jindal (former chairperson of Jindal Industries and Minister in Haryana government) and his wife Savitri Jindal (chairperson of Jindal Industries and Minister in Haryana government), Subhash Chandra (Chairman of Essel Group and Zee Network and BJP MP in Rajya Sabha), Amit Munjal, founder and CEO of Doctor Insta and Former CFO of Citi Holdings, Yash Tonk (Bollywood actor), Manish Joshi Bismil (theatre director), General V.K. Singh (Former Army Chief and Union Minister from BJP]], General Dalbir Singh Suhag (former Army Chief).

See also
 Hisar (city)
 Hisar division
 Hisar Urban Agglomeration
 Hisar (Vidhan Sabha constituency)
 Hisar (Lok Sabha constituency)
 Asigarh Fort at Hansi
 Kanwari Indus Valley Mound at Kanwari
 Tosham rock inscription

References

External links

 Hisar district official website

 
Districts of Haryana